Luís Alves Coelho Rocha (July 6, 1937 – March 8, 2001) was Brazilian politician and lawyer. He was born in Loreto, and was married to Terezinha Rocha, with whom he had two children, Luís Rocha Filho and Roberto Rocha. He served as governor of Maranhão, from 1983 to 1986. Rocha died in São Luís on March 8, 2001.

References  

Governors of Maranhão
Democratic Social Party politicians
Brazilian Social Democracy Party politicians
1937 births
2001 deaths